André Gagné is a Canadian professor of theology at Concordia University.

Education 
Gagné has a B.Th. (2001) and Master of Arts (2003) from l'Université de Montréal, and a conjoint Ph.D. from l'Université catholique de Louvain and l'Université de Montréal (2008).

Career and research 
Gagné taught from 2005-2008 at the joint department of religious studies at Laurentian University. He is a full professor at Concordia University. Gagné is a Member of the Centre for the Study of Learning and Performance (CSLP),  a research associate of the Centre de recherche Société, Droit et Religions de l'Université de Sherbrooke (SoDRUS),  an Associate Member at the Institut d'études anciennes et médiévales de l'Université Laval (IÉAM),  and a co-researcher with the Centre d'expertise de formation sur les intégrismes religieux, les idéologies politiques et la radicalisation (CEFIR).  In 2017, he was Directeur d'études invité at École pratique des hautes études.

Gagné's scholarship focuses on the interpretation and reception of the Bible, Political theology and Religious violence. He was also a collaborator on la bibliothèque copte de Nag Hammadi (BCNH) project at l'Université Laval from 2012-2019.

Awards and honors 
In 2016, Gagné received the Opinion Leader of the Year Award for his involvement with the media in connection with the religious right, fundamentalism, radicalization and religious violence. He has also been awarded the 2010 CCSL Outstanding Contribution Award for excellency in teaching and student mentorship. The same year, Gagné was awarded the New Scholar Award at Concordia University. The award recognizes outstanding scholarly achievement by a tenure-track faculty member.

Books

References

External links
 André Gagné, Department of Theological Studies, Concordia University
 Concordia University

Living people
Academics in Quebec
Academic staff of Concordia University
Université catholique de Louvain alumni
Academic staff of Laurentian University
Université de Montréal alumni
Year of birth missing (living people)